Kevin Myles Stephen Holland  (30 March 1910 – 12 October 1996) was an Australian politician.

He was born in North Melbourne to Jack Holland and Agnes Mary Ryan. He attended Catholic schools and became a health inspector with the Victorian Health Department. During World War II he served in the Army Medical Corps in the Pacific. He was a delegate with the Miscellaneous Workers' Union and served as a Labor member of Melbourne City Council from 1951 to 1975, leading the party on council from 1955. In 1956 he was elected to the Victorian Legislative Assembly in a by-election to succeed his father in the seat of Flemington. He held the seat until its abolition in 1967, when he retired from the Assembly. From 1975 to 1980 he was on the Keilor City commission, and was commissioner of the Melbourne and Metropolitan Board of Works. On 15 January 1964 he had married Annie Catherine Sheila Duffy. He was appointed a member of the Order of Australia in 1983. Holland died in 1996.

References

1910 births
1996 deaths
Australian Labor Party members of the Parliament of Victoria
Members of the Victorian Legislative Assembly
Members of the Order of Australia
20th-century Australian politicians
Australian Army personnel of World War II
People from North Melbourne
Politicians from Melbourne
Military personnel from Melbourne